E474 may refer to:
 A fictional aircraft based on the Airbus A380 in the movie Flightplan
 Sucroglycerides, molecules used as emulsifiers